A tow boat ride is a water ride constructed on a body of water. The course is defined by a main drive underwater cable, creating the
impression of free floating boats. The station could be a revolving platform.

Partial list of tow boat rides

See also 
 Old Mill (ride)
 Chain boat navigation

References

External links
Intamin official website
Mack rides official website
Ride Engineers Switzerland official website Formerly Swiss rides, former Bear Rides, former ABC Rides

 
Amusement rides lists